The Reich Debt Administration was the entity responsible for managing German state debt from 1900-1946.

Prussian origins
The organisation was founded in 1820 as the Prussian government debt administration with Christian von Rother as its first president. After the granting of the Constitution of Prussia (1850), public debt management was reorganized. Although the main administration remained a separate authority from the general financial administration, it was subordinate to the Prussian Ministry of Finance. With the founding of the North German Confederation in 1867 and the German Empire in 1871, the authority extended its remit over the newly unified territories. also took over debt management for the respective federal territory. It also undertook the conversion of bonds issued in legacy currencies into the new mark currency.

German Empire

In 1900 the organisation was renamed the Reich Debt Administration when the first Reich Debt Ordinance was issued. This summarized various older laws on the acceptance and administration of the Reich debts. At the same time, the main administration of the national debt was renamed the Reich Debt Administration. The nominal leadership lay with the Reich Chancellor. 

During the Empire, the Commission that oversaw the Reich Debt Administration consisted of six members each from the Federal Council and the Reichstag. Added to this was the President of the Reich Audit Office. In addition to supervising the Reich Debt Administration, the Commission also supervised the Reich War Treasury and the Reich Disability Fund. For the latter task, the Commission was strengthened by another five members. The Commission was also responsible for issuing, confiscating and destroying Reich banknotes from the Reichsbank.

Weimar Republic

A second Reich debt code was passed in 1924 after the currency reform. This clarified the type of borrowing and at the same time confirmed the independence of the authority. In the same year, the administration moved into its new building in Berlin.

Nazi and post-war periods
After the beginning of National Socialist rule, the right to approve loans was transferred from the Reichstag to the Reich government as part of the Enabling Act of 1933.

Most of the debt register files were destroyed by air raids in 1945. In 1946, debt management was assigned to the Allied Military Command. In March 1948, the Reich Debt Administration was renamed the “Management Group for Archives of the Former Reich Debt Administration”. In July of the same year, a debt administration of the United Economic Area was established. The Federal Debt Administration emerged from this in 1949. This was renamed the Federal Securities Administration in 2002. In August 2006, this was merged into the German Finance Agency.

Commission heads
1820-1848: :de:Christian von Rother
1848-1861: Heinrich August Christian Nathan
1861-1874: :de:Busso von Wedell
1874-1879: :de:Botho Heinrich zu Eulenburg
1879-1892: Friedrich Hermann Sydow
1892-1905: Otto von Hoffmann
1905-1907: Rudolf von Bitter the Younger
1907-1918: Alexander von Bischoffshausen
1918-1928: Carl Halle
1929-1944: Ernst Articus
1945-22. May 1945: Oskar Georg Fischbach
1945-1951: :de:Siegfried Schultzenstein
1948-1955: :de:Wilhelm Dieben

References

1900 establishments in Germany
Government debt
Public finance of Germany